G protein-coupled receptor 64 also known as HE6 is a protein encoded by the ADGRG2 gene. GPR64 is a member of the adhesion GPCR family.
Adhesion GPCRs are characterized by an extended extracellular region often possessing N-terminal protein modules that is linked to a TM7 region via a domain known as the GPCR-Autoproteolysis INducing (GAIN) domain.

The adhesion GPCR, GPR64, is an orphan receptor characterized by a long N-terminus with that has been suggested to be highly glycosylated.  GPR64's N-terminus has been reported to be cleaved at the GPS domain to allow for trafficking to the plasma membrane.  After cleavage the N-terminus is believed to remain non-covalently associated with the 7TM. GPR64 expression has been mostly reported in the male reproductive organs, but more recently has been shown to be expressed in the parathyroid glands and central nervous system. GPR64 is mainly expressed in human and mouse epididymis as well as human prostate and parathyroid. GPR64, together with F-actin scaffold, locates at the nonciliated principal cells of the proximal male excurrent duct epithelia, where reabsorption of testicular fluid and concentration of sperm takes place.

Function 
Targeting of Gpr64 in mice causes reduced fertility or infertility in males; but the reproductive capacity was unaffected in females. Unchanged hormone expression in knockout males indicates that the receptor functions immediately in the male genital tract. Lack of Gpr64 expression causes sperm stasis and duct obstruction due to abnormal fluid reabsorption. In addition, expression of GPR64 has been found in fibroblast-like synovial cells obtained from osteoarthritis but not from rheumatoid arthritis.

Clinical significance 
GPR64 is significantly overexpressed in the Wnt signaling-dependent subgroup of medulloblastoma, as well as in ewing sarcomas and carcinomas derived from prostate, kidney or lung. Richter et al. demonstrated that GPR64 promotes tumor invasion and metastasis through placental growth factor and MMP1. Upregulation and activation of GPR64 are associated with primary hyperparathyroidism and hypersecretion of parathyroid hormone.

References

External links 
 Adhesion GPCR consortium
 

G protein-coupled receptors